is a former Japanese football player.

Playing career
Takusagawa was born in Tokyo on February 12, 1981. After graduating from high school, he joined J1 League club Avispa Fukuoka in 1999. On October 2, he debuted as substitute goalkeeper against Sanfrecce Hiroshima because regular goalkeeper Nobuyuki Kojima received a red card in the 48th minute. Next match on October 30, he played as starting member against Gamba Osaka. However the club lost in both matches and he could only play these matches at the club from 2000. In 2001, he moved to J2 League club Shonan Bellmare. However he could not play at all in the match and retired end of 2002 season.

Club statistics

References

External links

1981 births
Living people
Association football people from Tokyo
Japanese footballers
J1 League players
J2 League players
Avispa Fukuoka players
Shonan Bellmare players
Association football goalkeepers